William Thompson (1812 – September 12, 1872) was an American sailor who was a Signal Quartermaster in the American Civil War and recipient of the Medal of Honor for action at Forts Beauregard and Walker on Hilton Head, South Carolina, on November 7, 1861. He was wounded by a piece of shell which caused his legs to be amputated.

References

External links 
 Grave
NJ Medal of Honor recipients

1812 births
1872 deaths
American Civil War recipients of the Medal of Honor
People of New Jersey in the American Civil War
Union Navy sailors
United States Navy Medal of Honor recipients
People from Cape May County, New Jersey
Burials at Mount Moriah Cemetery (Philadelphia)
Date of birth unknown